General Superintendent can refer to:

 There are many Christian denominations that have the office of General Superintendent. This is generally the highest elected office:
General Superintendent (Church of the Nazarene), the highest elected office in the Church of the Nazarene
General Superintendent of the Evangelical Church of Berlin-Brandenburg-Silesian Upper Lusatia
 A manager of a railroad or public transit system, senior in rank to a superintendent.